The Australian–American Memorial is in Canberra, the national capital of Australia, and commemorates the help given by the United States during the Pacific War.

Background
In 1948 the Australian-American Association proposed "to establish a Memorial in Canberra in the form of a monument or statue, to perpetuate the services and sacrifices of the United States forces in Australia and to symbolise Australian-American comradeship in arms". After an appeal for finances by then Prime Minister of Australia, Sir Robert Menzies, the Australian people subscribed more than the eventual cost of £100,000, then a vast sum of money for such a public memorial, indicating the gratitude of the nation. Additional memorials were constructed in Brisbane and Adelaide that used the surplus funds.

A committee, which included Richard Casey (then Minister for External Affairs and a former Australian Ambassador to the United States) and Sir Keith Murdoch, was formed to examine designs for the monument. Sydney architect, and World War 2 veteran, Richard M. Ure won the design following a nationwide competition. Work commenced in December 1952 and took just over a year. As Vice President, Richard Nixon visited the site in the early stages of construction. It was unveiled by Queen Elizabeth II on 16 February 1954.

Description
The memorial is a hollow, octagonal, tapered column with a steel framework sheeted with aluminium panels that were sandblasted to give the appearance of stone. Two murals feature at the base, one relating the story of American combat in the Pacific and the other a profile map of the United States in copper. Under the dedication is a bronze wreath, carved by Walter Langcake, where floral wreaths are often laid on official commemorations. The column is topped with a bronze sphere surmounted by a stylised figure of the American eagle by the distinguished sculptor and Royal Navy veteran, Paul Beadle.

The memorial has been nicknamed 'Chicken on a stick'and Bugs Bunny'.

Location
It was built at Russell Hill on the extended line of Kings Avenue, near one of the three nodes of the Parliamentary Triangle. Russell Offices has since been developed around the memorial, as the headquarters of the Australian Defence Force and the Department of Defence, with the immediate surrounds called Blamey Square after Field Marshal Sir Thomas Blamey.

It underwent a major restoration in 2014, after which a new plaque at its base was unveiled.

Gallery

See also

 Australia–United States relations
 Pacific War

References

External links
 Australian-American Memorial at the National Capital Authority website
 Australian - American Memorial at Monument Australia website

1954 sculptures
Australia–United States relations
Monumental columns
Military memorials in Canberra
Monuments and memorials in the Australian Capital Territory
1954 establishments in Australia